Pituitary ACTH hypersecretion (or Cushing disease) is a form of hyperpituitarism characterized by an abnormally high level of ACTH produced by the anterior pituitary. It is one of the causes of Cushing's syndrome. (However, Cushing's syndrome can be caused by many other causes, including exogenous administration.)

References

External links 

Pituitary disorders